Nostradamus is a 1994 biographical drama film directed by Roger Christian and starring Tchéky Karyo as astrologer Michel de Nostredame (often Latinised as Nostradamus).  It co-stars Amanda Plummer, Julia Ormond, Assumpta Serna, Anthony Higgins, Diana Quick, Michael Gough, Maia Morgenstern, Rutger Hauer and F. Murray Abraham.

Co-produced by companies from France, the United Kingdom, Germany and Romania, the film was a commercial failure and received mixed reviews.

Plot
The film recounts the life and loves of the physician, astrologer, and famed prognosticator; his encounters with medieval science at the University of Montpellier and the Inquisition; and his early struggles with his visions of the future. The film is set in France in the 16th century during one of the periodic plague outbreaks. Nostradmus meets up with Scaliger in Agen.

Nostradamus prophesies the death of Henry II of France in a jousting match. Nostradamus also says that he "constantly has this word" Hister on his mind. The film depicts Nostradamus's rise in influence, because of both his success in treating plague and his predictions, culminating in his appointment as court physician to Charles IX of France (son of Henry II).

Cast
Tchéky Karyo as Michel de Nostradamus
F. Murray Abraham as Julius Caesar Scaliger
Rutger Hauer as The Mystic Monk
Amanda Plummer as Catherine de' Medici
Julia Ormond as Marie
Assumpta Serna as Anne Gemelle
Anthony Higgins as King Henry II
Diana Quick as Diane de Poitiers
Michael Gough as Jean de Remy
Maia Morgenstern as Helen
Magdalena Ritter as Sophie
Leon Lissek as Inquisitor
Michael Byrne as Inquisitor

External links

1994 films
1990s biographical drama films
British biographical drama films
Films directed by Roger Christian
Films set in France
Films set in the 16th century
French biographical drama films
Orion Pictures films
German biographical drama films
Romanian biographical drama films
Films shot in Romania
English-language French films
English-language German films
English-language Romanian films
Cultural depictions of Nostradamus
Cultural depictions of Catherine de' Medici
1994 drama films
1990s English-language films
1990s British films
1990s French films
1990s German films